Robert John Ballard (born 25 September 1964) is a former Australian track and field athlete. He represented Australia at both the Olympic Games and the Commonwealth Games, where he failed to any win medals.

At the 1988 Summer Olympics in Seoul, South Korea, he teamed up with Mark Garner, Miles Murphy and Darren Clark to make the final of the 4 × 400 metres relay where they finished sixth.

At the 1990 Commonwealth Games in Auckland, New Zealand, he teamed up with Leigh Miller, Mark Garner and Robert Stone where they were disqualified in the second heat in the 4 × 400 metres relay.

On 23 August 2000, Ballard was awarded the Australian Sports Medal for his athletic achievements.

References

External links
 
 
 
 
 
 

1964 births
Living people
Australian male middle-distance runners
Olympic athletes of Australia
Athletes (track and field) at the 1988 Summer Olympics
Athletes (track and field) at the 1990 Commonwealth Games
Recipients of the Australian Sports Medal
Commonwealth Games competitors for Australia